Salem is an unincorporated community located in northern Surry County, North Carolina, United States on the outskirts of the city of Mount Airy.  The community generally lies between Lovills Creek and the Ararat River .  Prominent landmarks include Salem United Methodist Church.

References

Unincorporated communities in Surry County, North Carolina
Unincorporated communities in North Carolina